The 1999 Oklahoma State Cowboys baseball team represented the Oklahoma State University–Stillwater in the 1999 NCAA Division I baseball season. The Cowboys played their home games at Allie P. Reynolds Stadium. The team was coached by Tom Holliday in his 3rd year as head coach at Oklahoma State.

The Cowboys won the Wichita Regional and Waco Super Regional to advance to the College World Series, where they were defeated by the Rice Owls.

Roster

Schedule

! style="" | Regular Season: 41–14
|- valign="top" 

|- bgcolor="#ddffdd"
| 1 || February 7 ||  || No. 19 || Allie P. Reynolds Stadium • Stillwater, Oklahoma || W 22–1 || 1–0 || 
|- bgcolor="#ddffdd"
| 2 || February 13 ||  || No. 20 || Allie P. Reynolds Stadium • Stillwater, Oklahoma || W 13–9 || 2–0 || –
|- bgcolor="#ddffdd"
| 3 || February 14 || Milwaukee || No. 20 || Allie P. Reynolds Stadium • Stillwater, Oklahoma || W 24–3 || 3–0 || –
|- bgcolor="#ffdddd"
| 4 || February 18 || vs.  || No. 19 || Charlie Smith Field • San Diego, California || L 0–1 || 3–1 || –
|- bgcolor="#ddffdd"
| 5 || February 19 || at  || No. 19 || Charlie Smith Field • San Diego, California || W 12–2 || 4–1 || –
|- bgcolor="#ddffdd"
| 6 || February 20 || vs.  || No. 19 || Charlie Smith Field • San Diego, California || W 6–2 || 5–1 || –
|- bgcolor="#ddffdd"
| 7 || February 21 || vs. No. 15 Arizona || No. 19 || Charlie Smith Field • San Diego, California || W 7–4 || 6–1 || –
|- bgcolor="#ddffdd"
| 8 || February 23 ||  || No. 13 || Allie P. Reynolds Stadium • Stillwater, Oklahoma || W 25–4 || 7–1 || –
|- bgcolor="#ddffdd"
| 9 || February 24 || Chicago State || No. 13 || Allie P. Reynolds Stadium • Stillwater, Oklahoma || W 36–2 || 8–1 || –
|- bgcolor="#ffdddd"
| 10 || February 26 || at No. 12 Texas A&M || No. 13 || Olsen Field • College Station, Texas || L 3–5 || 8–2 || 0–1
|- bgcolor="#ffdddd"
| 11 || February 27 || at No. 12 Texas A&M || No. 13 || Olsen Field • College Station, Texas || L 4–7 || 8–3 || 0–2
|- bgcolor="#ffdddd"
| 12 || February 28 || at No. 12 Texas A&M || No. 13 || Olsen Field • College Station, Texas || L 3–4 || 8–4 || 0–3
|-

|- bgcolor="#ddffdd"
| 13 || March 2 ||  || No. 23 || Allie P. Reynolds Stadium • Stillwater, Oklahoma || W 22–3 || 9–4 || –
|- bgcolor="#ddffdd"
| 14 || March 3 || Prairie View A&M || No. 23 || Allie P. Reynolds Stadium • Stillwater, Oklahoma || W 24–0 || 10–4 || –
|- bgcolor="#ffdddd"
| 15 || March 5 || No. 21  || No. 23 || Allie P. Reynolds Stadium • Stillwater, Oklahoma || L 2–5 || 10–5 || 0–4
|- bgcolor="#ddffdd"
| 16 || March 6 || No. 21 Baylor || No. 23 || Allie P. Reynolds Stadium • Stillwater, Oklahoma || W 12–1 || 11–5 || 1–4
|- bgcolor="#ffdddd"
| 17 || March 7 || No. 21 Baylor || No. 23 || Allie P. Reynolds Stadium • Stillwater, Oklahoma || L 4–11 || 11–6 || 1–5
|- bgcolor="#ddffdd"
| 18 || March 9 ||  || No. 29 || Allie P. Reynolds Stadium • Stillwater, Oklahoma || W 22–1 || 12–6 || 1–5
|- bgcolor="#ffdddd"
| 19 || March 17 || at  || No. 27 || TCU Diamond • Fort Worth, Texas || L 4–5 || 12–7 || –
|- bgcolor="#ddffdd"
| 20 || March 19 || vs  || No. 27 || Allie P. Reynolds Stadium • Stillwater, Oklahoma || W 19–6 || 13–7 || 2–5
|- bgcolor="#ddffdd"
| 21 || March 20 || vs Iowa State || No. 27 || Allie P. Reynolds Stadium • Stillwater, Oklahoma || W 5–4 || 14–7 || 3–5
|- bgcolor="#ddffdd"
| 22 || March 21 || vs Iowa State || No. 27 || Allie P. Reynolds Stadium • Stillwater, Oklahoma || W 7–3 || 15–7 || 4–5
|- bgcolor="#ddffdd"
| 23 || March 23 ||  || No. 27 || Allie P. Reynolds Stadium • Stillwater, Oklahoma || W 11–5 || 16–7 || –
|- bgcolor="#ddffdd"
| 24 || March 24 || Arkansas–Little Rock || No. 27 || Allie P. Reynolds Stadium • Stillwater, Oklahoma || W 15–2 || 17–7 || –
|- bgcolor="#ffdddd"
| 25 || March 26 || vs.  || No. 27 || Homestead Sports Complex • Homestead, Florida || L 6–10 || 17–8 || –
|- bgcolor="#ddffdd"
| 26 || March 27 || vs.  || No. 27 || Homestead Sports Complex • Homestead, Florida || W 17–7 || 18–8 || –
|- bgcolor="#ddffdd"
| 27 || March 28 || vs. Harvard || No. 27 || Homestead Sports Complex • Homestead, Florida || W 4–3 || 19–8 || –
|- bgcolor="#ddffdd"
| 28 || March 31 || No. 20  || No. 29 || Allie P. Reynolds Stadium • Stillwater, Oklahoma || W 11–5 || 20–8 || –
|-

|- bgcolor="#ddffdd"
| 29 || April 2 ||  || No. 29 || Allie P. Reynolds Stadium • Stillwater, Oklahoma || W 13–4 || 21–8 || 5–5
|- bgcolor="#ddffdd"
| 30 || April 3 || Kansas State || No. 29 || Allie P. Reynolds Stadium • Stillwater, Oklahoma || W 13–2 || 22–8 || 6–5
|- bgcolor="#ddffdd"
| 31 || April 4 || Kansas State || No. 29 || Allie P. Reynolds Stadium • Stillwater, Oklahoma || W 15–1 || 23–8 || 7–5
|- bgcolor="#ddffdd"
| 32 || April 7 || No. 26 Oral Roberts || No. 25 || Allie P. Reynolds Stadium • Stillwater, Oklahoma || W 12–6 || 24–8 || –
|- bgcolor="#ddffdd"
| 33 || April 9 || at No. 27  || No. 25 || Buck Beltzer Stadium •  Lincoln, Nebraska || W 10–2 || 25–8 || 8–5
|- bgcolor="#ffdddd"
| 34 || April 10 || at No. 27 Nebraska || No. 25 || Buck Beltzer Stadium • Lincoln, Nebraska || L 7–15 || 25–9 || 8–6
|- bgcolor="#ffdddd"
| 35 || April 11 || at No. 27 Nebraska || No. 25 || Buck Beltzer Stadium • Lincoln, Nebraska || L 2–6 || 25–10 || 8–7
|- bgcolor="#ddffdd"
| 36 || April 13 || TCU || No. 29 || Allie P. Reynolds Stadium • Stillwater, Oklahoma || W 21–9 || 26–10 || –
|- bgcolor="#ddffdd"
| 37 || April 17 || at  || No. 29 || Hoglund Ballpark • Lawrence, Kansas || W 16–10 || 27–10 || 9–7
|- bgcolor="#ddffdd"
| 38 || April 18 || at Kansas || No. 29 || Hoglund Ballpark • Lawrence, Kansas || W 12–10 || 28–10 || 10–7
|- bgcolor="#ddffdd"
| 39 || April 18 || at Kansas || No. 29 || Hoglund Ballpark • Lawrence, Kansas || W 6–1 || 29–10 || 11–7
|- bgcolor="#ffdddd"
| 40 || April 20 || at  || No. 28 || Doak Field • Raleigh, North Carolina || L 6–9 || 29–11 || –
|- bgcolor="#ddffdd"
| 41 || April 21 || at NC State || No. 28 || Doak Field • Raleigh, North Carolina || W 4–1 || 30–11 || –
|- bgcolor="#ddffdd"
| 42 || April 23 ||  || No. 28 || Allie P. Reynolds Stadium • Stillwater, Oklahoma || W 20–15 || 31–11 || –
|- bgcolor="#ddffdd"
| 43 || April 24 || BYU || No. 28 || Allie P. Reynolds Stadium • Stillwater, Oklahoma || W 6–4 || 32–11 || –
|- bgcolor="#ffdddd"
| 44 || April 27 ||  || No. 25 || Allie P. Reynolds Stadium • Stillwater, Oklahoma || L 2–5 || 32–12 || –
|- bgcolor="#ffdddd"
| 45 || April 30 || vs.  || No. 25 || Drillers Stadium • Tulsa, Oklahoma || L 3–4 || 32–13 || 11–8
|-

|- bgcolor="#ddffdd"
| 46 || May 1 || vs. Oklahoma || No. 25 || Southwestern Bell Park • Oklahoma City, Oklahoma || W 9–6 || 33–13 || 12–8
|- bgcolor="#ddffdd"
| 47 || May 2 || vs. Oklahoma || No. 25 || Southwestern Bell Park • Oklahoma City, Oklahoma || W 6–5 || 34–13 || 13–8
|- bgcolor="#ddffdd"
| 48 || May 7 || No. 21  || No. 27 || Allie P. Reynolds Stadium • Stillwater, Oklahoma || W 9–6 || 35–13 || 14–8
|- bgcolor="#ddffdd"
| 49 || May 8 || No. 21 Texas || No. 27 || Allie P. Reynolds Stadium • Stillwater, Oklahoma || W 8–5 || 36–13 || 15–8
|- bgcolor="#ddffdd"
| 50 || May 9 || No. 21 Texas || No. 27 || Allie P. Reynolds Stadium • Stillwater, Oklahoma || W 13–1 || 37–13 || 16–8
|- bgcolor="#ffdddd"
| 51 || May 11 || Oklahoma || No. 20 || Allie P. Reynolds Stadium • Stillwater, Oklahoma || L 9–10 || 37–14 || 16–9
|- bgcolor="#ddffdd"
| 52 || May 12 ||  || No. 20 || Allie P. Reynolds Stadium • Stillwater, Oklahoma || W 16–4 || 38–14 || –
|- bgcolor="#ddffdd"
| 53 || May 14 || at No. 17  || No. 20 || Dan Law Field • Lubbock, Texas || W 4–3 || 39–14 || 17–9
|- bgcolor="#ddffdd"
| 54 || May 15 || at No. 17 Texas Tech || No. 20 || Dan Law Field • Lubbock, Texas || W 12–3 || 40–14 || 18–9
|- bgcolor="#ddffdd"
| 55 || May 16 || at No. 17 Texas Tech || No. 20 || Dan Law Field • Lubbock, Texas || W 12–11 || 41–14 || 19–9
|-

|-
! style="" | Postseason: 6–6
|- valign="top" 

|- bgcolor="#ffdddd"
| 56 || May 19 || vs. (5) No. 24 Nebraska || (4) No. 17 || Southwestern Bell Park • Oklahoma City, Oklahoma || L 0–5 || 41–15 || 0–1
|- bgcolor="#ffdddd"
| 57 || May 20 || vs. (1) No. 6 Texas A&M || (4) No. 17 || Southwestern Bell Park • Oklahoma City, Oklahoma || L 2–4 || 41–16 || 0–2
|-

|- bgcolor="#ffdddd"
| 58 || May 28 || vs. (3)  || (2) No. 20 || Eck Stadium • Wichita, Kansas || L 6–12 || 41–17 || 0–1
|- bgcolor="#ddffdd"
| 59 || May 29 || vs. (4) No. 26 Oral Roberts || (2) No. 20 || Eck Stadium • Wichita, Kansas || W 12–4 || 42–17 || 1–1
|- bgcolor="#ddffdd"
| 60 || May 29 || vs. (3) UCLA || (2) No. 20 || Eck Stadium • Wichita, Kansas || W 17–10 || 43–17 || 2–1
|- bgcolor="#ddffdd"
| 60 || May 30 || vs. (1) No. 7  || (2) No. 20 || Eck Stadium • Wichita, Kansas || W 11–8 || 44–17 || 3–1
|- bgcolor="#ddffdd"
| 61 || May 30 || vs. (1) No. 7 Wichita State || (2) No. 20 || Eck Stadium • Wichita, Kansas || W 7–6 || 45–17 || 4–1
|-

|- bgcolor="#ddffdd"
| 62 || June 4 || vs. (4) No. 8 Baylor || No. 14 || Baylor Ballpark • Waco, Texas || W 18–11 || 46–17 || 5–1
|- bgcolor="#ffdddd"
| 63 || June 5 || vs. (4) No. 8 Baylor || No. 14 || Baylor Ballpark • Waco, Texas || L 7–17 || 46–18 || 5–2
|- bgcolor="#ddffdd"
| 64 || June 6 || vs. (4) No. 8 Baylor || No. 14 || Baylor Ballpark • Waco, Texas || W 6–2 || 47–18 || 6–2
|-

|- bgcolor="#ffdddd"
| 65 || June 11 || vs. (5) No. 7 Alabama || No. 8 || Johnny Rosenblatt Stadium • Omaha, Nebraska || L 3–11 || 47–19 || 0–1
|- bgcolor="#ffdddd"
| 66 || June 13 || vs. (8) No. 2  || No. 8 || Johnny Rosenblatt Stadium • Omaha, Nebraska || L 2–7 || 47–20 || 0–2
|-

Awards and honors 
Ryan Budde
Freshman All-American Collegiate Baseball

Thom Dreier
Honorable Mention All-Big 12 Conference

Billy Gasparino
First Team All-Big 12 Conference
Second Team All-American Collegiate Baseball
Third Team All-American National Collegiate Baseball Writers Association

Josh Holliday
First Team All-Big 12 Conference
Third Team All-American National Collegiate Baseball Writers Association

Jeremy Krismer
Honorable Mention All-Big 12 Conference

Kevin Lucas
Second Team All-Big 12 Conference

Lamont Matthews
First Team All-Big 12 Conference
Second Team All-American American Baseball Coaches Association
Third Team All-American Baseball America
Third Team All-American Collegiate Baseball

Jay McCullough
Honorable Mention All-Big 12 Conference

Rusty Rushing
Honorable Mention All-Big 12 Conference

Matt Smith
First Team All-Big 12 Conference
Second Team All-American National Collegiate Baseball Writers Association

References

Oklahoma State Cowboys baseball seasons
Oklahoma State Cowboys baseball
College World Series seasons
Oklahoma State